Sion (/ˈsaːjən/; IAST: Śīv [ʃiːʋ]) is a neighbourhood of Mumbai. In the 17th century the village formed the boundary between Mumbai and Salsette Island. The British named it marking the end of the city. The name remained even after Mumbai was joined to the Salsette and extended up to Mulund. One of the local historical places in Sion is a hilltop garden commonly known as Sion Fort or Sheevon Killa in the Marathi language.

History 
In 1543, the Portuguese took possession of the largely uninhabited islands of Bombay, naming it Sião, after a biblical hill in Israel. The Portuguese gave the Jesuit priests the sole ownership of some of these islands. The Jesuits then built a chapel on the hill near the present-day railway station and named it after Mount Zion (Sion) in Jerusalem.

Education 
Sion is also a home to many educational institutes, namely:
 D.S.Highschool, Sion
 Ayurved College Sion
 K. J. Somaiya Institute Of Engineering & Information Technology
 Shiv Shikshan Sanstha's School (Eng. Med.)
 SIES College of Commerce and Economics
 SIES College of Arts, Science, and Commerce
 Padmabhushan Vasantdada Patil Pratishthan's College of Engineering
 K. J. Somaiya Medical College & Research Centre.
 Lokmanya Tilak Municipal General Hospital
 Our Lady Of Good Counsel High School
 Sadhana Vidyalaya English primary and secondary High school

Notable former residents 
 Mithun Chakraborthy
 Sadhana
 Boney Kapoor
 Akshay Kumar
 Johnny Lever
 K.N.Singh

See also 
 K. J. Somaiya Institute Of Engineering & Information Technology
 Sion Fort
 Our Lady of Good Counsel High School, Mumbai

References 

Suburbs of Mumbai
Mumbai City district